is a Japanese politician of the Constitutional Democratic Party and a member of the House of Councillors in the Diet (national legislature). A native of Asakura District, Fukuoka and graduate of Fukuoka University of Education, she was elected for the first time in 2001.

References

External links 
  in Japanese.

Members of the House of Councillors (Japan)
Female members of the House of Councillors (Japan)
Politicians from Fukuoka Prefecture
Living people
1948 births
People from Asakura, Fukuoka
Constitutional Democratic Party of Japan politicians
Democratic Party of Japan politicians